The 2013 O'Reilly Auto Parts Challenge was the 31st stock car race of the 2013 NASCAR Nationwide Series and the ninth iteration of the event. The race was held on Saturday, November 2, 2013, in Fort Worth, Texas at Texas Motor Speedway, a  permanent tri-oval shaped racetrack. The race took the scheduled 200 laps to complete. At race's end, Brad Keselowski, driving for Penske Racing, would pull away in the late stages of the race to win his 26th career NASCAR Nationwide Series win and his sixth win of the season. To fill out the podium, Denny Hamlin of Joe Gibbs Racing and Sam Hornish Jr. of Penske Racing would finish second and third, respectively.

Background 

Texas Motor Speedway is a speedway located in the northernmost portion of the U.S. city of Fort Worth, Texas – the portion located in Denton County, Texas. The track measures 1.5 miles (2.4 km) around and is banked 24 degrees in the turns, and is of the oval design, where the front straightaway juts outward slightly. The track layout is similar to Atlanta Motor Speedway and Charlotte Motor Speedway (formerly Lowe's Motor Speedway). The track is owned by Speedway Motorsports, Inc., the same company that owns Atlanta and Charlotte Motor Speedway, as well as the short-track Bristol Motor Speedway.

Entry list 

 (R) denotes rookie driver.
 (i) denotes driver who is ineligible for series driver points.

Practice

First practice 
The first practice session was held on Friday, November 1, at 1:05 PM CST, and would last for 55 minutes.

Second practice 
The second and final practice session, sometimes referred to as Happy Hour, was held on Friday, November 1, at 5:00 PM CST, and would last for one hour and 30 minutes.

Qualifying 
Qualifying was held on Saturday, November 2, at 11:05 AM CST. Each driver would have two laps to set a fastest time; the fastest of the two would count as their official qualifying lap.

Morgan Shepherd was the only driver to fail to qualify.

Full qualifying results

Race results

Standings after the race 

Drivers' Championship standings

Note: Only the first 10 positions are included for the driver standings.

References 

2013 NASCAR Nationwide Series
NASCAR races at Texas Motor Speedway
November 2013 sports events in the United States
2013 in sports in Texas